Sainte-Croix (Vivaro-Alpine: Santa Crotz) is a commune in the Drôme department in southeastern France.

Population

See also
Communes of the Drôme department
Parc naturel régional du Vercors

References

External links

  Official site

Communes of Drôme